Power of Attorney is an American syndicated nontraditional court show that differed from other judge shows in that each side was represented by famous attorneys who cross-examined witnesses. It was produced by 20th Century Fox Television.

Cast
The pool of attorneys who made appearances on the program included:
Johnnie Cochran, defense attorney in the O. J. Simpson murder trial
Marcia Clark, prosecutor in the Simpson trial
Christopher Darden, prosecutor in the Simpson trial
Geoffrey Fieger, defense attorney for Jack Kevorkian
Wendy Murphy, former sex crimes prosecutor, attorney and television personality
Gloria Allred, attorney and television personality
Keith Fink, attorney for Courtney Love
Dominic Barbara, attorney for Joey Buttafuoco
Benedict Morelli
Ted Williams

The show's judge was Andrew Napolitano during the first season, 2000–2001, and in the second season, 20th Television's Judge Lynn Toler (later of Divorce Court) was the presiding judge. Joseph J. Catalano II (son of Divorce Court former bailiff Joseph J. Catalano) was the court show's bailiff and Andy Geller was the court show's announcer.

Broadcast history
The show was cancelled mid-way through the second season due to low ratings, the effects of preemptions at the start of the second season due to the September 11 attacks breaking the momentum of Judge Lynn's debut, and the high cost of the 10 or so rotating high-profile attorneys.

References

External links
 

2000s American legal television series
2001 American television series debuts
2002 American television series endings
Court shows
First-run syndicated television programs in the United States
Television series by 20th Century Fox Television